The Karachi Kings–Lahore Qalandars rivalry, is a cricket rivalry between two teams in the Pakistan Super League (PSL), an old city rivalry between the cricket teams of Karachi and Lahore that continued in PSL as well. It is considered to be  the biggest rivalry in the PSL due to the size of the cities. The rivalry has been fuelled by the size of the two cities that they play for and their historic economic and cultural rivalry. A Karachi–Lahore clash is known typically as a heated contest which "brings out the best in players". The two cities share a rivalry in domestic cricket that dates back to the 1950s and 1960s, with the PSL providing a high-voltage platform that allows it to thrive. It is sometimes also known as the El-Clasico of PSL. 

Both teams have played on 14 occasions against each other, with Karachi Kings winning 8 of them.  In 2016 season, Kings won both games against Qalandars. While in 2nd season both teams won against each other.  Karachi won the first game of the 2018 season,  while the second match was a close contest which ended in a tie, in the end Lahore winning in the super over due to excellent super over bowled by Qalandars' Sunil Narine. In the 2019 season, both teams won one game each while in the 2020 season, both teams won one game apiece before facing off in the final which Karachi won by 5 wickets. In 2021, Lahore won the first game in Karachi by 6 wickets while the second game was won by Karachi in Abu Dhabi by 7 runs. In 2022, Lahore won the first game in Karachi by 6 wickets.

List of PSL titles

Results summary

Head-to-head ranking in PSL(2016–2023)
 Total: Karachi Kings with 6 higher finishes, Lahore Qalandars with 2 higher finishes (as of the end of the 2023 PSL).
 The biggest difference in positions for Karachi Kings from Lahore Qalandars is 3 places (2018 PSL), The biggest difference in positions for Lahore Qalandars from Karachi Kings is 5 places (2022 PSL).
  Karachi Kings
  Lahore Qalandars

Players part of both franchises

In popular culture
The rivalry was referenced in episode one ("Stewie's First Word") of season 19 of the American animated sitcom Family Guy. At the start of the episode, Peter, Cleveland, Quagmire and Joe are sitting at the bar, where Quagmire complains about the influx of foreign sports fans on Saturday mornings, "like those Pakistani cricket hooligans". Two Pakistani supporters wearing Lahore jerseys retort: "If you're not rooting for Lahore, please you may leave I can tell you" and "Lahore cricketers are the best and the others are not the best, dear friends". Joe, who is apparently supporting Karachi, quickly covers his jersey as he doesn't "have a death wish about it [his preferred team]".

See also
 Pakistan Super League
 India–Pakistan cricket rivalry
 Chennai Super Kings–Mumbai Indians rivalry

References

Cricket rivalries
 
 
History of the Pakistan Super League